Sayed Abdallah (born 12 January 2000) is an Egyptian professional footballer who plays as a midfielder in Zamalek SC.

References

Living people
Egyptian footballers
Egypt youth international footballers
Association football midfielders
Zamalek SC players
Egyptian Premier League players
2000 births